West Hawk is a meteorite crater in Manitoba, Canada.

It is 2.44 km in diameter and the age is estimated to be 351 ± 20 million years (Mississippian). The crater lies beneath the main central portion of West Hawk Lake in Whiteshell Provincial Park, and is not exposed at the surface.

References

External links
Aerial Exploration of the West Hawk Structure

Impact craters of Manitoba
Carboniferous impact craters
Whiteshell Provincial Park